The Abu Dhabi Executive Council is the local executive authority of the Abu Dhabi Government for the Emirate of Abu Dhabi. It assists the Ruler of Abu Dhabi in enforcing local and federal decrees and leading the Abu Dhabi Government. The Council holds meetings periodically in Abu Dhabi to discuss issues and memos referred to it by Abu Dhabi's departments and governmental authorities, concerning the progress of government-sponsored projects, the development of services, reviewing government performance and appointing heads of local departments or agencies. All Governmental departments report to the ADEC, and membership of the ADEC primarily includes the heads of local governmental departments. Since 2004, the Chairman of the ADEC has been Sheikh Mohamed bin Zayed Al Nahyan who was appointed as Crown Prince of Abu Dhabi and continues to serve as chairman following his assumption of the position of Ruler of Abu Dhabi and President of the UAE in May 2022.

History
In 1971, a Council of Ministers was formed in the Abu Dhabi Emirate by virtue of the provisions of Law No. (1) to reorganise the government apparatus. But in 1974, the said law was superseded and substituted with Law No. (1), which organised Abu Dhabi's government apparatus, renaming the "Council of Ministers" as the "Abu Dhabi Executive Council." The Executive Council is chaired since 2004 by Sheikh Mohammed bin Zayed Al Nahyan, currently president of the United Arab Emirates, ruler of Abu Dhabi and Supreme Commander of the UAE Armed Forces. Its membership is formed by chairmen of the local government departments, some local authorities and other members appointed by the Ruler.

On Wednesday 13 September 2017 the council was reshuffled and new members were appointed, including: Sheikh Theyab bin Mohamed bin Zayed Al Nahyan, Falah Al Ahbabi and Mohammed Khalifa Al Mubarak.

On Monday 21 January 2019 the then President of the UAE, Sheikh Khalifa, approved a reorganisation which changed the members of the council:

 Three members left the Council including Maj Gen Mohammed Al Rumaithi, Riyad Abdulrahman Al Mubarak and Dr Ali Al Nuaimi.
 Two new members joined: Sara Awad Issa Musallam, Chairwoman of the Department of Education and Knowledge; and Maj Gen Faris Khalaf Al Mazrouei, the new Commander-in-Chief of Abu Dhabi Police.

As part of this reorganization Sheikh Mohamed bin Zayed also set up a body affiliated with the council, the Abu Dhabi Strategic Affairs Committee, chaired by Sheikh Tahnoun bin Zayed Al Nahyan, and restructured the council's executive committee.

Abu Dhabi Executive Office 
 established the Abu Dhabi Executive Office (ADEO) as an independent entity, replacing the Secretariat of the ADEC with a task of supporting the ADEC in administrative duties, legal opinions, researching proposals provided by governmental departments, contracting third-party consultants, and publishing the official gazette. The Chairman of the Executive Office also assumes a seat at the ADEC. Since 2019, the ADEO has been led by Sheikh Khaled bin Mohamed Al Nahyan, the son of Sheikh Mohamed bin Zayed Al Nahyan.

Members
As of 2022 members included:
Sheikh Mohamed bin Zayed Al Nahyan (Emir of Abu Dhabi, President of the UAE, Chairman of the Executive Council)
Sheikh Tahnoun bin Zayed Al Nahyan
Sheikh Hazza bin Zayed Al Nahyan (Vice-chairman of the Executive Council)
Sheikh Hamed bin Zayed Al Nahyan 
Sheikh Khaled bin Mohamed Al Nahyan (Member of the Executive Council, Chairman of Abu Dhabi Executive Office, chairman of the executive committee)
Sheikh Theyab bin Mohamed bin Zayed Al Nahyan (Chairman of Abu Dhabi Crown Prince's Court)
Sheikh Mohammed bin Khalifa bin Zayed Al Nahyan
Sheikh Sultan bin Tahnoon Al Nahyan
Khaldoon Khalifa Al Mubarak (Chairman of the Executive Affairs Authority)
Mohamed Khalifa Al Mubarak (Chairman of the Department of Culture and Tourism)
Dr. Mugheer Khamis Al Khaili (Chairman of the Department of Community Development)
Dr. Ahmed Mubarak Al Mazrouei (Secretary-General of the Executive Council)
Jassem Mohamed Bu Ataba Al Zaabi (Chairman of the Department of Finance)
Eng. Awaidha Murshed Al Marar (Chairman of Energy Authority)
Abdulla bin Mohamed bin Butti Al Hamed (Chairman of Health Authority)
Falah Mohamed Al Ahbabi (Chairman of the Department of Municipalities and Transport)
Mohammed Ali Al Shorafa Al Hammadi (Chairman of Abu Dhabi Department of Economic Development)
Sara Awad Issa Musallam (Chairman of Abu Dhabi Department of Education and Knowledge)

References

External links
Official Site

Government of Abu Dhabi
Politics of the United Arab Emirates
Abu Dhabi